Sir Harold Bernard St. John, KA (16 August 1931 – 29 February 2004) was a Barbadian politician who served as the third prime minister of Barbados from 1985 to 1986. To date, he is the shortest serving Barbadian prime minister. He was leader of the Barbados Labour Party from 1970 to 1971 and again from 1985 to 1987.  He was widely known as Bree.

Biography
St. John was born in the Parish of Christ Church and attended the Christ Church Foundation School. He was professionally trained as a lawyer at the University College London and was called to the Bar at the Inner Temple in 1958. In 1959, before the island became independent from the United Kingdom, St. John joined the Barbados Labour Party beginning an opposition representative in the pre-independence Senate of Barbados in 1964. After independence in 1966, he was elected to the Barbados House of Assembly. He served as a member of the Upper Chamber between 1971 and 1976 as a member of the Opposition party.

St. John left the Upper House when he was re-elected to the House of Assembly in 1976, when his party under J. M. G. Adams won the election. He served in numerous cabinet positions in the 1970s including deputy prime minister, minister of trade and industry, and minister of tourism, where he did his most influential work in developing the tourism industry in Barbados. When Adams died in 1985, St. John became Prime Minister. During his tenure as prime minister, he held the additional portfolio of Minister of Finance. The following year he was defeated in the elections by Errol Barrow and the Democratic Labour Party.

In 1994 when the BLP regained power, he did not return to the Cabinet and served instead as a backbencher under Owen Arthur. That same year St. John was conferred the highest honour in Barbados; he was made a Knight of St. Andrew (KA) of the Order of Barbados.

In 2004, Bernard St. John died of cancer in Bridgetown, aged 72. He left his widow Lady Stella (née Hope) and three children: Bryte, Charmaine and Nicole.

See also

 Politics of Barbados
 List of Premiers/Prime Ministers of Barbados

References

External links
 

1931 births
2004 deaths
Alumni of University College London
Finance ministers of Barbados
Members of the Senate of Barbados
Leaders of the Barbados Labour Party
Prime Ministers of Barbados
Deputy Prime Ministers of Barbados
People educated at Harrison College (Barbados)
Deaths from cancer in Barbados
People from Christ Church, Barbados
Members of the House of Assembly of Barbados
Knights and Dames of St Andrew (Barbados)